San Juan is a corregimiento in San Francisco District, Veraguas Province, Panama with a population of 1,591 as of 2010. Its population as of 1990 was 3,797; its population as of 2000 was 4,028.

References

Corregimientos of Veraguas Province